Fatimah Rohani binti Ismail (born 27 March 1992), known professionally as Emma Maembong, is a Malaysian actress and model of Scottish descent. She is best known by her roles as Munirah in Kau Yang Terindah, Nawwal Husna in Projek Memikat Suami, Aryana in Yes Boss, Medina Izwani in Isteri Separuh Masa and Farhah in Tersuka Tanpa Sengaja.

Early life
Fatimah Rohani binti Ismail was born on 27 March 1992 to Ismail Embong, who is also known by his moniker Maembong, a well-known national arts artist and Yatimah Zainab, a British immigrant. Her last name (Maembong) was obtained by combining her father's name, Ismail with her grandfather's name, Embong. She is the 9th daughter of 11 siblings with a mixed parentage of a British mother and a Malay father. Her younger sister, Chacha Maembong is also an actress.

Filmography

Film

Telemovie

Television series

Television

Awards and nominations

References

External links
 

1992 births
Living people
Malaysian people of Malay descent
Malaysian people of British descent
Malaysian people of Scottish descent
Malaysian Muslims
21st-century Malaysian actresses
Malaysian television personalities
Malaysian female models
Malaysian film actresses
Malaysian television actresses